Łysa Góra  (Bald Mountain; also known as Łysiec or Święty Krzyż) is a well-known hill in Świętokrzyskie Mountains, Poland. With a height of 595 metres (1,952 ft), it is the second highest point in that range (after Łysica at 612 meters or 2,008 ft). On its slopes and atop its summit are several hiking trails, the ruins of a pagan wall from 9th century, the Benedictine monastery Święty Krzyż from the 11th century (destroyed during the Second World War, now partially restored), and a Święty Krzyż TV Tower. The mountain also features prominently in a local legend about witches' sabbaths.

Location
Łysa Góra, composed primarily of quartzite and Cambrian slates, lies in the eastern part of the Łysogóry range, and is the second largest peak of the larger Świętokrzyskie Mountains (after Łysica). A notable summit within the Świętokrzyski National Park, it is a vital point in many sightseeing trails of the region. The blue path to Pętkowice begins here, and the red path from Gołoszyce to Kuźniaki passes through here.

Notable landmarks

During the times of prehistory of Poland, Łysa Góra was likely a sacred mountain and a site of a pagan temple of three gods, mentioned in the Annals of Jan Długosz. There are remains of a quartzite U-shaped wall surrounding the higher part of the hill, with length of about 1.5 km and height of 2m from 8th-10th centuries. The temple was abandoned after the baptism of Poland. The legend about witches' sabbaths is likely related to the old cult.

On the site of the pagan temple the Benedictine monastery of Holy Cross (Święty Krzyż) was founded (according to a legend, in 1006, by king of Poland, Bolesław I the Brave, but most sources give the 11th century). The monastery was named after a fragment from Christ' Cross which was supposedly enshrined there, and was a site of frequent pilgrimages. The monastery was destroyed and rebuilt several times throughout its history, with the most significant destruction taking place in the 19th and 20th centuries. After the Partitions of Poland, the Russian Empire took over the building in 1819 and converted it into a prison. It was partially restored during the interwar period after Poland regained independence. During World War II, the German occupiers murdered the abbot of the monastery during a massacre of Poles committed on 12 June 1940 in Kielce (see: Nazi persecution of the Catholic Church in Poland). and the monastery was taken over by the Nazi Germany and used as a prison and execution site of Soviet prisoners of war (about 6,000 perished here). After the war, the Polish communist government transferred the building to the Świętokrzyski National Park, which renovated parts of them. Currently the National Park has a museum in some of the former buildings, while a part has been taken over by another religious institute (Missionary Oblates of Mary Immaculate). Due to its cultural and historical importance, the abbey complex is listed as a Historic Monument of Poland. The abbey, although now past its Golden Age, has given its names to the Świętokrzyskie Mountains range as well as the Świętokrzyskie Voivodeship itself. The abbey also holds some mummified bodies; one of them is rumored (but not confirmed) to belong to Prince Jeremi Wiśniowiecki.

Another notable building found on the hill is the Święty Krzyż TV Tower; the tallest free-standing TV tower in Poland. Built in 1966, it is a 157 metre tall concrete tower.

The Soviet prisoners executed by the Nazis are buried in a mass grave near the peak. At the bottom of the hill, there is a monument to Poles who died in the Katyn massacre.

Gallery

See also
 Brocken
 Lysa Hora

References
  Łysa Góra, entry in PWN Encyklopedia

Notes

External links

  Święty Krzyż - Sanktuarium  Relikwii Drzewa Krzyża Świętego

Mountains of Poland
Landforms of Świętokrzyskie Voivodeship